Cedar Township is a civil township of Osceola County in the U.S. state of Michigan. The population was 406 at the 2000 census.

History
Cedar Township was established in 1871.

Geography

Demographics
As of the census of 2000, there were 406 people, 147 households, and 114 families residing in the township.  The population density was 11.8 per square mile (4.5/km2).  There were 335 housing units at an average density of 9.7 per square mile (3.7/km2).  The racial makeup of the township was 97.29% White, 1.23% Native American, 0.25% Asian, 0.25% from other races, and 0.99% from two or more races. Hispanic or Latino of any race were 1.48% of the population.

There were 147 households, out of which 31.3% had children under the age of 18 living with them, 70.1% were married couples living together, 4.1% had a female householder with no husband present, and 22.4% were non-families. 15.0% of all households were made up of individuals, and 8.8% had someone living alone who was 65 years of age or older.  The average household size was 2.72 and the average family size was 3.08.

In the township the population was spread out, with 27.8% under the age of 18, 4.2% from 18 to 24, 23.4% from 25 to 44, 26.8% from 45 to 64, and 17.7% who were 65 years of age or older.  The median age was 40 years. For every 100 females, there were 104.0 males.  For every 100 females age 18 and over, there were 106.3 males.

The median income for a household in the township was $38,500, and the median income for a family was $39,583. Males had a median income of $30,795 versus $23,750 for females. The per capita income for the township was $16,618.  About 2.7% of families and 2.2% of the population were below the poverty line, including none of those under age 18 and 2.8% of those age 65 or over.

References

Notes

Sources

Townships in Osceola County, Michigan
1871 establishments in Michigan
Townships in Michigan